Yakurr is a Local Government Area of Cross River State, Nigeria. Its capital is the town of Ugep. The local government area (LGA) was carved out of Obubra local government in 1987.
 
Yakurr has an area of 670 km and a population of 196,450 at the 2006 census. The postal code of the area is 543.

Major settlements in the local government area include: Ugep, Mkpani, Idomi, Ekori, Inyima, Nko, Assiga, Agoi Ibami, Agoi Ekpo, and  Agoi Efreke.

Notable people 
 Okoi Arikpo, first Nigerian minister for foreign affairs
 Usani Uguru Usani, former Minister of Niger Delta

References

See also
Yako people

Local Government Areas in Cross River State